Antoa Nyamaa is a popular river god deity with its shrine located at Antoa in the Ashanti Region in Ghana.

References

Shrines
Religious buildings and structures in Africa
Buildings and structures in Ghana
Ashanti Region